The 1960 Tour de Romandie was the 14th edition of the Tour de Romandie cycle race and was held from 12 May to 15 May 1960. The race started and finished in Nyon. The race was won by Louis Rostollan.

General classification

References

1960
Tour de Romandie